Mr. District Attorney in the Carter Case is a 1941 American crime film directed by Bernard Vorhaus and written by Sidney Sheldon and Ben Roberts. The film stars James Ellison, Virginia Gilmore, Franklin Pangborn, Paul Harvey, Lynne Carver and Spencer Charters. The film was released on December 18, 1941, by Republic Pictures. It was a sequel to the film Mr. District Attorney.

Plot

Cast 
 James Ellison as P. Cadwallader Jones
 Virginia Gilmore as Terry Parker
 Franklin Pangborn as Charley Towne
 Paul Harvey as Dist. Atty. Winton
 Lynne Carver as Joyce Belmont
 Spencer Charters as Judge White
 Douglas Fowley as Vincent Mackay
 John Eldredge as Andrew Belmont
 Eddie Acuff as Hypo
 John Sheehan as Beanie
 Bradley Page as Elliott Carter

See also 
 Mr. District Attorney (1941)
 Secrets of the Underground (1942)

References

External links 
 

1941 films
American crime films
1941 crime films
Republic Pictures films
Films directed by Bernard Vorhaus
American black-and-white films
1940s English-language films
1940s American films